Cyana rubrifasciata is a moth of the family Erebidae. It was described by Herbert Druce in 1883. It is found on Sulawesi in Indonesia.

References

Cyana
Moths described in 1883